James Nicholls may refer to:
 James Nicholls (footballer) (1908–1984), English football goalkeeper
 James Nicholls (rugby league), rugby league player of the 1940s
 James Fawckner Nicholls (1818–1883), English antiquarian and librarian
 Jim Nicholls (1919–2002), English football goalkeeper

See also
 James Nichols (disambiguation)